England was represented at the 2010 Commonwealth Games by Commonwealth Games England. The country's abbreviation was ENG, they used the Cross of St George as its flag and "Jerusalem" as its victory anthem. It had previously used "Land of Hope and Glory" as its anthem at the Commonwealth Games, but decided to change following an "internet poll".

England's delegation is notable for including two Paralympic champions, who qualified to compete in Delhi against fully able-bodied athletes: Danielle Brown, who won a gold medal in archery at the 2008 Summer Paralympics, and Sarah Storey, who won two gold medals in cycling in 2008. They are the first English athletes with disabilities ever to compete in able-bodied events at the Commonwealth Games.

England 2010

Key
 Qualifiers / Medal Winners
 Top 8 Finish (Non Medal Winners)
 Non-Qualifiers / Non Top 8 Finish

Shooting

Team England consists of 22 shooters over 34 events

Clay Target
Men

Women

Pistol
Men

Women

Small Bore
Men

Women

Full Bore

Squash

Team England consists of 10 squash players over 5 events. The competition draw was announced on 22 September 2010. (Seeds are denoted in brackets after players' names)

Men's Singles

Women's Singles

Men's Doubles

Women's Doubles

Mixed Doubles

Table Tennis

Team England consists of 11 table tennis players over 8 events.

Men's Singles

Women's Singles

EAD Para-Sports – Women's Wheelchair Singles

Men's Doubles

Women's Doubles

Mixed Doubles

Men's Team
Andrew Baggaley, Paul Drinkhall, Darius Knight, Liam Pitchford, Daniel Reed

Women's Team
Hannah Hicks, Karina Lefevre, Joanna Parker, Kelly Sibley

Tennis

Team England consisted of 7 players over 5 events. On 28 September 2010, Richard Bloomfield announced his withdrawal from the games due to a back injury. He was replaced by Josh Goodall. The competition draws were announced on 1 October 2010. (Seeds are denoted in brackets after players' names)

Medal Tally

Men's Singles

Women's Singles

Men's Doubles

Women's Doubles

Mixed Doubles

Weightlifting

Team England consisted of 12 athletes over 10 events.

Medal Tally

Men

Men – EAD (Powerlifting)

Women

Women – EAD (Powerlifting)

Wrestling

Team England consisted of 12 athletes over 13 events.

Medal Tally

Men's Freestyle

Men's Greco-Roman

Women's Freestyle

See also
England at the Commonwealth Games
England at the 2006 Commonwealth Games

References

External links
 Commonwealth Games England – Official website
 Commonwealth Games Info System – Official website

2010
Nations at the 2010 Commonwealth Games
Commonwealth Games